Wigerus Vitringa (October 8, 1657 – January 18, 1725), was a Dutch seascape painter.

Biography

Vitringa was born in Leeuwarden.  According to the RKD he was the son of a prominent lawyer who could financially permit himself a career in the arts. He was the pupil of Richard Brakenburg and possibly also the pupil of Ludolf Bakhuizen, whose style he followed. He moved to Alkmaar in the 1680s where his eyesight slowly deteriorated. He became a member of the Guild of St. Luke there in 1696. In 1708 he returned to Friesland where he became a teacher. His most notable pupil was Tako Hajo Jelgersma.  Vitringa died in Wirdum.

References

Vitringa search term in the database of the Fries Scheepvaartmuseum
Wigerus Vitringa on Artnet

1657 births
1725 deaths
17th-century Dutch painters
18th-century Dutch painters
18th-century Dutch male artists
Dutch male painters
Dutch marine artists
Frisian painters
Painters from Alkmaar
People from Leeuwarden